The 2021–22 Toronto Raptors season was the 27th season of the franchise in the National Basketball Association (NBA).

The 2020–21 Raptors finished the season with a 27–45 record (in a shortened season due to the COVID-19 pandemic), and missed the playoffs for the first time since 2013. This season marked the first time since the 2012–13 season where the Raptors had their own lottery pick, and with that pick, which landed 4th overall in the 2021 NBA Draft, they drafted power forward Scottie Barnes from Florida State. Barnes would go on to win the 2021–22 NBA Rookie of the Year Award.

The season was the first season that six-time All-Star and longtime Raptor Kyle Lowry was not on the roster since the 2011–12 season, as he was traded in a sign-and-trade deal to the Miami Heat for Goran Dragić and Precious Achiuwa.

On September 10, 2021, the Canadian government granted approval for the team to play home games in Toronto for the first time since the onset of the COVID-19 pandemic. In the prior season, they played their home games in Amalie Arena in Tampa, Florida.

After a win against the Atlanta Hawks and a Cleveland Cavaliers loss to the Orlando Magic on April 5, 2022, the Raptors returned to the playoffs after a one year absence and clinched their eighth playoff appearance in nine seasons. However, the Raptors were eliminated by the 76ers in six games in the first round after being down 3–0 in that series.

Draft picks

The Raptors entered the draft with one first round pick and two second round picks. On the night of the 2021 NBA draft lottery, the team had a 7.5% chance of winning the first overall pick and ended up with the #4 pick. They also gained two second round picks as a result of previous trades with Utah and Sacramento. This marked the first time that the Raptors drafted a Canadian-born player in the draft, as they selected point guard Dalano Banton from Nebraska with the 46th pick.

Roster

Standings

Division

Conference

Record vs opponents

(* game decided in overtime)

Game log

Preseason

|-style="background:#cfc;"
| 1
| October 4
| Philadelphia
| 
| OG Anunoby (21)
| Justin Champagnie (10)
| Fred VanVleet (8)
| Scotiabank Arena8,016
| 1–0
|-style="background:#fcc;"
| 2
| October 7
| @ Philadelphia
| 
| OG Anunoby (22)
| Precious Achiuwa (8)
| Scottie Barnes (5)
| Wells Fargo Center11,732
| 1–1
|-style="background:#fcc;"
| 3
| October 9
| @ Boston
| 
| Fred VanVleet (22)
| Precious Achiuwa (13)
| Scottie Barnes (8)
| TD Garden19,156
| 1–2
|-style="background:#cfc;"
| 4
| October 11
| Houston
| 
| Achiuwa, Anunoby (17)
| Achiuwa, Wainright (7)
| Fred VanVleet (5)
| Scotiabank Arena9,245
| 2–2
|-style="background:#cfc;"
| 5
| October 12
| @ Washington
| 
| Malachi Flynn (22)
| Achiuwa, Champaigne (10)
| Scottie Barnes (7)
| Capital One Arena7,048
| 3–2

Regular season

|-style="background:#fcc;"
| 1
| October 20
| Washington
| 
| Barnes, VanVleet (12)
| OG Anunoby (10)
| Dragić, VanVleet (4)
| Scotiabank Arena19,800
| 0–1
|-style="background:#cfc;"
| 2
| October 22
| @ Boston
| 
| Scottie Barnes (25)
| Precious Achiuwa (15)
| Fred VanVleet (9)
| TD Garden19,156
| 1–1
|-style="background:#fcc;"
| 3
| October 23
| Dallas
| 
| OG Anunoby (23)
| Precious Achiuwa (12)
| Fred VanVleet (5)
| Scotiabank Arena19,800
| 1–2
|-style="background:#fcc;"
| 4
| October 25
| Chicago
| 
| OG Anunoby (22)
| Precious Achiuwa (11)
| Fred VanVleet (17)
| Scotiabank Arena19,800
| 1–3
|-style="background:#cfc;"
| 5
| October 27
| Indiana
| 
| Fred VanVleet (26)
| Fred VanVleet (10)
| Scottie Barnes (7)
| Scotiabank Arena19,800
| 2–3
|-style="background:#cfc;"
| 6
| October 29
| Orlando
| 
| Scottie Barnes (21)
| Scottie Barnes (9)
| Fred VanVleet (6)
| Scotiabank Arena19,800
| 3–3
|-style="background:#cfc;"
| 7
| October 30
| @ Indiana
| 
| Scottie Barnes (21)
| Scottie Barnes (12)
| OG Anunoby (5)
| Gainbridge Fieldhouse10,578
| 4–3

|-style="background:#cfc;"
| 8
| November 1
| @ New York
| 
| OG Anunoby (36)
| Precious Achiuwa (9)
| Fred VanVleet (8)
| Madison Square Garden16,528
| 5–3
|-style="background:#cfc;"
| 9
| November 3
| @ Washington
| 
| Fred VanVleet (33)
| Precious Achiuwa (10)
| Fred VanVleet (6)
| Capital One Arena13,538
| 6–3
|-style="background:#fcc;"
| 10
| November 5
| Cleveland
| 
| OG Anunoby (23)
| Scottie Barnes (9)
| Fred VanVleet (6)
| Scotiabank Arena19,800
| 6–4
|-style="background:#fcc;"
| 11
| November 7
| Brooklyn
| 
| Fred VanVleet (21)
| Achiuwa, Anunoby (8)
| Fred VanVleet (8)
| Scotiabank Arena19,800
| 6–5
|-style="background:#fcc;"
| 12
| November 10
| @ Boston
| 
| Scottie Barnes (21)
| Precious Achiuwa (9)
| Fred VanVleet (6)
| TD Garden19,156
| 6–6
|-style="background:#cfc;"
| 13
| November 11
| @ Philadelphia
| 
| Fred VanVleet (32)
| Achiuwa, Barnes (9)
| Fred VanVleet (7)
| Wells Fargo Center20,112
| 7–6
|-style="background:#fcc;"
| 14
| November 13
| Detroit
| 
| Pascal Siakam (25)
| Pascal Siakam (12)
| Pascal Siakam (7)
| Scotiabank Arena19,800
| 7–7
|-style="background:#fcc;"
| 15
| November 15
| @ Portland
|  
| OG Anunoby (29)
| Scottie Barnes (8)
| Fred VanVleet (7)
| Moda Center16,142
| 7–8
|-style="background:#fcc;"
| 16
| November 18
| @ Utah
|  
| Gary Trent Jr. (31)
| Chris Boucher (8)
| Scottie Barnes (6)
| Vivint Arena18,306
| 7–9
|-style="background:#cfc;"
| 17
| November 19
| @ Sacramento
| 
| Pascal Siakam (32)
| Chris Boucher (12)
| Barnes, VanVleet (6)
| Golden 1 Center13,159
| 8–9
|-style="background:#fcc;"
| 18
| November 21
| @ Golden State
| 
| Pascal Siakam (21)
| Scottie Barnes (13)
| Fred VanVleet (7)
| Chase Center18,064
| 8–10
|-style="background:#cfc;"
| 19
| November 24
| @ Memphis
| 
| Gary Trent Jr. (26)
| Scottie Barnes (9)
| Fred VanVleet (7)
| FedEx Forum15,409
| 9–10
|-style="background:#fcc;"
| 20
| November 26
| @ Indiana
| 
| Fred VanVleet (26)
| Pascal Siakam (12)
| Barnes, Siakam, VanVleet (4)
| Gainbridge Fieldhouse14,579
| 9–11
|-style="background:#fcc;"
| 21
| November 28
| Boston
| 
| Fred VanVleet (27)
| Precious Achiuwa (9)
| Pascal Siakam (5)
| Scotiabank Arena19,800
| 9–12
|-style="background:#fcc;"
| 22
| November 30
| Memphis
| 
| Pascal Siakam (20)
| Fred VanVleet (9)
| Pascal Siakam (5)
| Scotiabank Arena19,800
| 9–13

|-style="background:#cfc;"
| 23
| December 2
| Milwaukee
| 
| Fred VanVleet (29)
| Achiuwa, Siakam, Trent Jr. (8)
| Barnes, Siakam, VanVleet (4)
| Scotiabank Arena19,800
| 10–13
|-style="background:#cfc;"
| 24
| December 5
| Washington
| 
| Pascal Siakam (31)
| Precious Achiuwa (14)
| Dalano Banton (6)
| Scotiabank Arena19,800
| 11–13
|-style="background:#fcc;"
| 25
| December 8
| Oklahoma
| 
| Gary Trent Jr. (24)
| Pascal Siakam (11)
| Fred VanVleet (9)
| Scotiabank Arena19,800
| 11–14
|-style="background:#cfc;"
| 26
| December 10
| New York
| 
| Gary Trent Jr. (24)
| Scottie Barnes (15)
| Fred VanVleet (11)
| Scotiabank Arena19,800
| 12–14
|-style="background:#cfc;"
| 27
| December 13
| Sacramento
| 
| Barnes, Siakam (16)
| Yuta Watanabe (10)
| Fred VanVleet (5)
| Scotiabank Arena19,463
| 13–14
|-style="background:#fcc;"
| 28
| December 14
| @ Brooklyn
| 
| Fred VanVleet (31)
| Scottie Barnes (12)
| Fred VanVleet (9)
| Barclays Center17,325
| 13–15
|- style="background:#ccc;"
| —
| December 16
| Chicago
| colspan="6" |Postponed (COVID-19) 
|-style="background:#cfc;"
| 29
| December 18
| Golden State
| 
| Fred VanVleet (27)
| Barnes, Boucher (8)
| Fred VanVleet (12)
| Scotiabank Arena7,988
| 14–15
|- style="background:#ccc;"
| —
| December 20
| Orlando
| colspan="6" |Postponed (COVID-19) 
|-style="background:#ccc;"
| —
| December 22
| @ Chicago
| colspan="6" | Postponed (COVID-19) 
|-style="background:#fcc;"
| 30
| December 26
| @ Cleveland
| 
| Yuta Watanabe (26)
| Yuta Watanabe (13)
| Banton, Waters (6)
| Rocket Mortgage FieldHouse19,432
| 14–16
|-style="background:#fcc;"
| 31
| December 28
| Philadelphia
| 
| Boucher, Siakam (28)
| Chris Boucher (19)
| Pascal Siakam (8)
| Scotiabank Arena6,960
| 14–17
|-style="background:#cfc;"
| 32
| December 31
| L.A. Clippers
| 
| Fred VanVleet (31)
| Pascal Siakam (19)
| Fred VanVleet (9)
| Scotiabank Arena0
| 15–17

|- style="background:#cfc;"
| 33
| January 2
| New York
| 
| Fred VanVleet (35)
| Pascal Siakam (14)
| Pascal Siakam (7)
| Scotiabank Arena0
| 16–17
|- style="background:#cfc;"
| 34
| January 4
| San Antonio
| 
| Fred VanVleet (33)
| Pascal Siakam (12)
| Scottie Barnes (8)
| Scotiabank Arena0
| 17–17
|- style="background:#cfc;"
| 35
| January 5
| @ Milwaukee
| 
| Pascal Siakam (33)
| Precious Achiuwa (8)
| Pascal Siakam (6)
| Fiserv Forum17,341
| 18–17
|- style="background:#cfc;"
| 36
| January 7
| Utah
| 
| Fred VanVleet (37)
| Fred VanVleet (10)
| Fred VanVleet (10)
| Scotiabank Arena0
| 19–17 
|- style="background:#cfc;"
| 37
| January 9
| New Orleans
| 
| Fred VanVleet (32)
| Pascal Siakam (10)
| Pascal Siakam (7)
| Scotiabank Arena0
| 20–17
|- style="background:#fcc;"
| 38
| January 11
| Phoenix
| 
| OG Anunoby (25)
| Chris Boucher (16)
| Pascal Siakam (7)
| Scotiabank Arena0
| 20–18
|- style="background:#fcc;"
| 39
| January 14
| @ Detroit
| 
| Fred VanVleet (24)
| Pascal Siakam (11)
| Fred VanVleet (10)
| Little Caesars Arena18,011
| 20–19
|- style="background:#cfc;"
| 40
| January 15
| @ Milwaukee
| 
| Pascal Siakam (30)
| Justin Champagnie (12)
| Pascal Siakam (10)
| Fiserv Forum17,341
| 21–19
|- style="background:#fcc;"
| 41
| January 17
| @ Miami
| 
| Chris Boucher (23)
| Precious Achiuwa (15)
| Pascal Siakam (10)
| FTX Arena19,600
| 21–20
|- style="background:#fcc;"
| 42
| January 19
| @ Dallas
| 
| Pascal Siakam (21)
| Chris Boucher (12)
| Fred VanVleet (12)
| American Airlines Center19,218
| 21–21
|- style="background:#cfc;"
| 43
| January 21
| @ Washington
| 
| Scottie Barnes (27)
| OG Anunoby (9)
| Fred VanVleet (12)
| Capital One Arena14,755
| 22–21
|- style="background:#fcc;"
| 44
| January 23
| Portland
| 
| Pascal Siakam (28)
| Chris Boucher (9)
| Fred VanVleet (8)
| Scotiabank Arena0
| 22–22
|- style="background:#cfc;"
| 45
| January 25
| Charlotte
| 
| Gary Trent Jr. (32)
| Pascal Siakam (9)
| Pascal Siakam (12)
| Scotiabank Arena0
| 23–22
|- style="background:#fcc;"
| 46
| January 26
| @ Chicago
| 
| Gary Trent Jr. (32)
| Pascal Siakam (7)
| Barnes, Siakam (7)
| United Center20,269
| 23–23
|- style="background:#cfc;"
| 47 
| January 29
| @ Miami
| 
| Gary Trent Jr. (33)
| OG Anunoby (14)
| Fred VanVleet (8)
| FTX Arena19,600
| 24–23
|- style="background:#cfc;"
| 48
| January 31
| @ Atlanta
| 
| Gary Trent Jr. (31)
| Chris Boucher (7)
| Fred VanVleet (11)
| State Farm Arena14,168 
| 25–23

|- style="background:#cfc;"
| 49
| February 1
| Miami
|  
| Gary Trent Jr. (33) 
| Pascal Siakam (14)
| Fred VanVleet (6)
| Scotiabank Arena0
| 26–23
|- style="background:#cfc;"
| 50
| February 3
| Chicago
| 
| Pascal Siakam (25)
| Pascal Siakam (13)
| Fred VanVleet (9)
| Scotiabank Arena0
| 27–23
|- style="background:#cfc;"
| 51
| February 4
| Atlanta
| 
| Pascal Siakam (33)
| OG Anunoby (10)
| Fred VanVleet (11)
| Scotiabank Arena0
| 28–23
|- style="background:#cfc;"
| 52
| February 7
| @ Charlotte
| 
| Siakam, Trent Jr. (24)
| Pascal Siakam (11)
| Pascal Siakam (8)
| Spectrum Center14,102
| 29–23
|- style="background:#cfc;"
| 53
| February 9
| @ Oklahoma City
| 
| Pascal Siakam (27)
| Pascal Siakam (16)
| Fred VanVleet (6)
| Paycom Center13,858
| 30–23
|- style="background:#cfc;"
| 54
| February 10
| @ Houston 
| 
| Gary Trent Jr. (42)
| Scottie Barnes (7)
| Scottie Barnes (6)
| Toyota Center16,129
| 31–23
|- style="background:#fcc;"
| 55
| February 12
| Denver
| 
| Pascal Siakam (35)
| Pascal Siakam (10)
| Pascal Siakam (7)
| Scotiabank Arena0
| 31–24
|- style="background:#fcc;"
| 56
| February 14
| @ New Orleans
| 
| Fred VanVleet (20)
| Birch, Boucher (6)
| Anunoby, VanVleet (2)
| Smoothie King Center15,319
| 31–25
|- style="background:#cfc;"
| 57
| February 16
| @ Minnesota
| 
| Gary Trent Jr. (30)
| Chris Boucher (10)
| Pascal Siakam (9)
| Target Center15,982
| 32–25
|- style="background:#fcc;"
| 58
| February 25
| @ Charlotte
| 
| Scottie Barnes (28)
| Achiuwa, Barnes, Young (5)
| Malachi Flynn (5)
| Spectrum Center17,577
| 32–26
|- style="background:#fcc;"
| 59
| February 26
| @ Atlanta
| 
| Fred VanVleet (24)
| Pascal Siakam (10)
| Fred VanVleet (9)
| State Farm Arena17,870
| 32–27
|- style="background:#cfc;"
| 60
| February 28
| @ Brooklyn
| 
| Scottie Barnes (28)
| Scottie Barnes (16)
| Pascal Siakam (6)
| Barclays Center17,112
| 33–27

|- style="background:#cfc;"
| 61
| March 1
| Brooklyn
| 
| Gary Trent Jr. (24)
| Scottie Barnes (10)
| Malachi Flynn (8)
| Scotiabank Arena18,903
| 34–27
|- style="background:#fcc;"
| 62
| March 3
| Detroit
| 
| Pascal Siakam (28)
| Barnes, Boucher (10)
| Gary Trent Jr. (4)
| Scotiabank Arena19,548
| 34–28
|- style="background:#fcc;"
| 63
| March 4
| Orlando
| 
| Pascal Siakam (34)
| Pascal Siakam (14)
| Malachi Flynn (8)
| Scotiabank Arena19,081
| 34–29
|- style="background:#fcc;"
| 64
| March 6
| @ Cleveland
| 
| Pascal Siakam (24)
| Scottie Barnes (12)
| Scottie Barnes (6)
| Rocket Mortgage FieldHouse19,432
| 34–30
|- style="background:#cfc;"
| 65
| March 9
| @ San Antonio
| 
| Fred VanVleet (26)
| Barnes, Siakam (8)
| Dalano Banton (4)
| AT&T Center15,121
| 35–30
|- style="background:#cfc;"
|  66
| March 11
| @ Phoenix 
| 
| Gary Trent Jr. (42)
| Trent Jr., VanVleet (8)
| Pascal Siakam (10)
| Footprint Center17,071
| 36–30
|- style="background:#cfc;"
|  67
| March 12
| @ Denver
| 
| Pascal Siakam (33)
| Chris Boucher (13)
| Scottie Barnes (10)
| Ball Arena18,659
| 37–30
|- style="background:#cfc;"
|  68
| March 14
| @ L.A. Lakers
| 
| Gary Trent Jr. (28)
| Achiuwa, Siakam (11)
| Fred VanVleet (7)
| Crypto.com Arena18,228
| 38–30
|- style="background:#cfc;"
|  69
| March 16
| @ L.A. Clippers
| 
| Pascal Siakam (31)
| Pascal Siakam (12)
| Siakam, VanVleet (3)
| Crypto.com Arena19,068
| 39–30
|- style="background:#fcc;"
|  70
| March 18
| L.A. Lakers
| 
| Scottie Barnes (31)
| Scottie Barnes (17)
| Siakam, VanVleet (7)
| Scotiabank Arena19,800
| 39–31
|- style="background:#cfc;"
| 71
| March 20
| @ Philadelphia
| 
| Pascal Siakam (26)
| Chris Boucher (10)
| Pascal Siakam (5)
| Wells Fargo Center21,180
| 40–31
|- style="background:#fcc;"
| 72
| March 21
| @ Chicago
| 
| Pascal Siakam (22)
| Chris Boucher (10)
| Fred VanVleet (9)
| United Center21,778
| 40–32
|- style="background:#cfc;"
| 73
| March 24
| Cleveland
| 
| Pascal Siakam (35)
| Chris Boucher (8)
| Fred VanVleet (8)
| Scotiabank Arena19,800
| 41–32
|- style="background:#cfc;"
| 74
| March 26
| Indiana
| 
| Pascal Siakam (23)
| Chris Boucher (10)
| Barnes, Siakam (7)
| Scotiabank Arena19,800
| 42–32
|- style="background:#cfc;"
| 75
| March 28
| Boston
| 
| Pascal Siakam (40)
| Pascal Siakam (13)
| Scottie Barnes (4)
| Scotiabank Arena19,800
| 43–32
|- style="background:#cfc;"
| 76
| March 30
| Minnesota
| 
| Gary Trent Jr. (29)
| Pascal Siakam (10)
| Pascal Siakam (13)
| Scotiabank Arena19,800
| 44–32

|- style="background:#cfc;"
| 77
| April 1
| @ Orlando
| 
| Barnes, VanVleet (19)
| Pascal Siakam (11)
| Scottie Barnes (7)
| Amway Center17,566
| 45–32
|- style="background:#fcc;"
| 78
| April 3
| Miami
| 
| Siakam, VanVleet (29)
| Pascal Siakam (8)
| Fred VanVleet (7)
| Scotiabank Arena19,800
| 45–33
|- style="background:#cfc;"
| 79
| April 5
| Atlanta
|  
| Pascal Siakam (31)
| Scottie Barnes (14)
| Fred VanVleet (9)
| Scotiabank Arena19,800
| 46–33
|- style="background:#cfc;"
| 80
| April 7
| Philadelphia
| 
| Pascal Siakam (37)
| Pascal Siakam (11)
| Pascal Siakam (12)
| Scotiabank Arena19,800
| 47–33
|- style="background:#cfc;"
| 81
| April 8
| Houston
| 
| Pascal Siakam (29)
| Pascal Siakam (12)
| Pascal Siakam (7)
| Scotiabank Arena19,800
| 48–33
|- style="background:#fcc;"
| 82 
| April 10
| @ New York
| 
| Chris Boucher (21)
| OG Anunoby (9)
| Scottie Barnes (5)
| Madison Square Garden19,812
| 48–34

Playoffs

|- style="background:#fcc;"
| 1
| April 16
| @ Philadelphia
| 
| Pascal Siakam (24)
| Scottie Barnes (10)
| Scottie Barnes (8)
| Wells Fargo Center20,610
| 0–1
|- style="background:#fcc;"
| 2
| April 18
| @ Philadelphia
| 
| OG Anunoby (26)
| Pascal Siakam (10)
| Fred VanVleet (7)
| Wells Fargo Center20,974
| 0–2
|- style="background:#fcc;"
| 3
| April 20
| Philadelphia
| 
| OG Anunoby (26)
| Achiuwa, Boucher (6)
| Fred VanVleet (9)
| Scotiabank Arena19,800
| 0–3
|- style="background:#cfc;"
| 4
| April 23
| Philadelphia
| 
| Pascal Siakam (34)
| Scottie Barnes (11)
| Siakam, Young (5)
| Scotiabank Arena19,800
| 1–3
|- style="background:#cfc;"
| 5
| April 25
| @ Philadelphia
| 
| Pascal Siakam (23)
| Pascal Siakam (10)
| Pascal Siakam (7)
| Wells Fargo Center20,517
| 2–3
|- style="background:#fcc;"
| 6
| April 28
| Philadelphia
| 
| Chris Boucher (25)
| Chris Boucher (10)
| Pascal Siakam (7)
| Scotiabank Arena19,800
| 2–4

Transactions

Overview

Trades

Free agency

Re-signed

Additions

Subtractions

References

Toronto Raptors seasons
Toronto Raptors
Toronto Raptors
Toronto Raptors
Tor